The canton of Avignon-Ouest is a French former administrative division in the department of Vaucluse and region Provence-Alpes-Côte d'Azur. It had 23,867 inhabitants (2012). It was disbanded following the French canton reorganisation which came into effect in March 2015. It comprised part of the communes of Avignon.

References

Avignon-Ouest
Avignon
2015 disestablishments in France
States and territories disestablished in 2015